Kristin Silbereisen (born March 14, 1985) is a German table tennis player. She currently plays for TTC Berlin Eastside.

Career
Silbereisen began playing table tennis when she was seven years old and started competing for DJK Ochtendung. As a Cadet and Junior, she won Team Gold at the European Youth Championships three times.

Silbereisen made her first performance for the senior team on October 12, 2004 against Italy. Since then, she has won the bronze medal at the 2009 European Championships in the Doubles competition (partnering Zhengqi Barthel), the bronze medal at the 2010 World Table Tennis Championships with the German team, as well as the Team Bronze Medal at the 2007 European Championships.

She won the German National Championships in Mixed doubles in 2005, partnering Christian Süss, and became German Singles Champion in 2010.

In May 2011, she qualified directly for the London 2012 Olympic Games via her ITTF world ranking.

Clubs
SV Winterwerb: until 2002
TuS Bad Driburg: 2002–2003
Homberger TS: 2003–2005
TV Busenbach: 2005–2010
FSV Kroppach: 2010–2013
TTC Berlin Eastside: 2013–

Career record

World Championships
 3rd place Women's Team: Moscow 2010

European Championships
3rd place Women's Team: Belgrade 2007
3rd place Women's Doubles: Stuttgart 2009

German Championships
Winner Women's Singles: 2010
Winner Women's Doubles: 2009 (with Zhengqi Barthel)
Winner Mixed: 2005 (with Christian Süss)
Runner-Up Women's Doubles: 2006 (with Elke Schall), 2007 (Irene Ivancan)
Winner Mixed: 2005 (with Christian Süss)
Runner-Up Mixed: 2003 (with Oliver Alke)

Pro Tour
Quarterfinals Marocco Open 2011
Quarterfinals Slovenian Open 2010
Quarterfinals Austrian Open 2010
3rd place Women's Team German Open 2008
3rd place Brazilian Open 2005
2nd place Danish Open 2004
Grand Finals participant 2004

References

External links
 Kristin Silbereisen – Official homepage

1985 births
Living people
German female table tennis players
Table tennis players at the 2012 Summer Olympics
Olympic table tennis players of Germany
World Table Tennis Championships medalists
People from Konstanz
Sportspeople from Freiburg (region)